Romain Arneodo and Fernando Romboli were the defending champions but only Romboli chose to defend his title, partnering Fabrício Neis. Romboli lost in the first round to Sergio Galdós and Federico Zeballos.

Guido Andreozzi and Guillermo Durán won the title after defeating Facundo Bagnis and Andrés Molteni 7–6(7–5), 6–4 in the final.

Seeds

Draw

References
 Main Draw

Uruguay Open - Doubles
2018 Doubles
2018 in Uruguayan tennis